Markens gate (English name: Markens street) is the main pedestrian street in Kristiansand, Norway. It is located in the west of the borough Kvadraturen and the length of the entire street is 1 kilometer, while the pedestrian part is 550 meters and another 160 meters with Otterdalsparken. The streets goes from Slottet Mall in the north and is a pedestrian street all the way down to Dronningens gate (Dronningens street), it's only crossed by traffic from Tordenskjolds gate, Kristian IVs gate and Henrik Wergelands gate before Dronningens gate. The pedestrian parts stretches over 7 quarters. Compared to other Norwegian cities, Markens street is one of the most walked streets in the country.

The street is an important road for the local city bus lines in Kristiansand.

Bus stops:
H. Wergelandsgate/Markens gate
H. Wergelandsgate pl. C, D, E, F, G, H, I
Tollbodgata/Markens gate
Tollbodgata nedre

Crossing streets (south to north):
Strandpronemaden
Østre Strandgate
Kongens gate
Dronningens gate
Tollbodgata
Rådhusgata
Gyldenløves gate
Skippergata
Henrik Wergelands gate
Kristian IVs gate
Tordenskjolds gate

Places
The town square is located in the middle of Markens with the Kristiansand Cathedral. The town square is filled with restaurants and cafes at the sidelines. It starts from Markens gate in the west and Wergelandsparken in the east. Wergelandsparken was created by Oscar Wergeland, Henrik Wergelands brother, in 1859 and finished in 1860. In 1866 there was placed a water fountain in the middle of the park, but this was later moved in 1908 for a statue of Henrik Wergeland in honor of his 100th birthday even though Henrik died in 1845. The statue was made by Gustav Vigeland and still stands there today.

Markens gate ends with Otterdalsparken, a park often referred to as Nupenparken since it was design by Norwegian contemporary artist Kjell Nupen whom was born and died in Kristiansand.

Sandens Mall is a shopping mall located with Tollbodgata in Markens gate. It is the largest mall on Kvadraturen. Lillemarkens is a small inside street with stores, it goes from Markens gate to Vestre Strandgate. Slottet Mall is the oldest mall on Kvadraturen, it is located with an exit of the highway to the parking lot.

References 

Geography of Kristiansand
Streets in Norway
Streets in Kristiansand